Kacha is an urban-type settlement under the City of Sevastopol's jurisdiction, a territory recognized by a majority of countries as part of Ukraine and incorporated by Russia as part of the Crimean Federal District.

Military outpost
There is an airbase in Kacha used by Russia and its Black Sea Fleet Naval Air Force as headquarters for the 25th Independent Anti-submarine Helicopter Regiment (25th AHR) and the 917th Independent Composite Air Regiment  (917th ICAR).

Demographics
 1926 — 366 inhabitants
 1939 — 2,834 inhabitants
 1989 — 5,783 inhabitants
 2001 — 6,320 inhabitants

See also
 Hvardiiske, Simferopol Raion

References

Towns in Nakhimov Raion, Sevastopol
Urban-type settlements in Sevastopol